Not My Kid is a 1985 American made-for-television drama film directed by Michael Tuchner, which was based on a 1984 book of the same name by Beth Polson (who also served as the film's executive producer) and Miller Newton. The movie aired on CBS in the United States, and had a VHS release both there and in the United Kingdom, with ITC handling distribution rights.

Plot
A teenaged drug addict is sent to Dr. Royce's controversial drug intervention program where the teenage addicts in the program confront each other in supervised group meetings. Also, in these meetings, the addicts are confronted by their families. The girl's mother want to remove her from the program because it upsets her that their daughter is being forced to associate with addicts who admit to stealing and trading sex to support their drug habits. They remain in denial until their daughter admits at a family confrontation meeting the full extent of her drug addiction. After this, they are able to address their own feelings about being the family of a hardcore drug addict. The daughter is reunited with her family only after all of them have acknowledged her addiction and accepted therapy for it.

Cast

References

External links

1980s teen drama films
1985 drama films
1985 films
1985 television films
American high school films
American teen drama films
CBS network films
Films scored by Mark Snow
Films about drugs
Films directed by Michael Tuchner
American drama television films
1980s English-language films
1980s American films